The Mpowerment Project  is a model community building and HIV prevention program that has been designed specifically to address the needs of young adult gay/bisexual men ages 18 – 29. It is the first documented HIV prevention intervention for young gay/bisexual men to succeed in reducing sexual risk behavior. The program has been developed, evaluated and continually refined by prominent behavioral scientists from the University of California, San Francisco's Center for AIDS Prevention Studies, the largest research center in the world dedicated to social, behavioral and policy science approaches to HIV.

In 1999, it was one of the first programs to be included in the Center for Disease Control and Prevention's Compendium of HIV Prevention Interventions with Evidence of Effectiveness. It is the only program included that is designed specifically to address the HIV Prevention needs of young gay/bisexual men and other young men who have sex with men (MSM). The Mpowerment Project uses outreach, a drop-in center and community-building efforts to strengthen young gay men's self-esteem, positive relationships, and social support. </ref> The project addresses HIV testing, PrEP, condoms use and staying on one's medications if one is living with HIV. Additionally, the project addresses interpersonal and social factors that affect the lives of young gay/bisexual men.

History

Recognizing the critical need for HIV prevention programs for young gay/bisexual men, Dr. Susan Kegeles and Dr. Robert Hays (1955-2001), research psychologists at the Center for AIDS Prevention Studies (CAPS) at the University of California, San Francisco, applied for funding to the National Institute of Mental Health (NIMH) to design, implement, and evaluate a community-level HIV prevention program for young gay/bisexual men. Their five-year grant was awarded in 1990.

They pilot tested the program in Santa Cruz, CA. Based on encouraging results there, they refined the program and implemented it in a second community (Eugene, OR), where it was named the Mpowerment Project. Following the program's success in Eugene, it was replicated in Santa Barbara, CA. In 1995 Drs. Kegeles and Hays received a second five-year grant form the NIMH to further develop the program for use in major metropolitan areas across the U.S. Dr. Greg Rebchook, a research psychologist who had worked at a department of public health and at a community-based organization, joined the team in 1996. This new grant enabled them to implement the Mpowerment Project in Albuquerque, NM – where the project was called MPower (1997–1998); and in Austin, TX – where the project was called Austin Men's Project / AMP (1999–2000). Since 2002, numerous organizations have implemented the program with varying success.

The Mpowerment Project is cost-effective compared with many other HIV prevention strategies. The cost per HIV infection prevented is far less than the lifetime medical costs of HIV disease. In 2005 the RAND Corporation developed a mathematical model of the cost of a wide variety of HIV prevention interventions. The Mpowerment Project is listed as the most cost-effective intervention.

Project Structure
The project is made of the Core Group, volunteers, and the Community Advisory Board (CAB).

The Core Group consists of 10-15 members who represent the demographics of that particular project's local gay and bisexual men's community. Volunteers are those who cannot devote as much time to the Core Group, but would still like to contribute. Volunteers are what help the program be as cost effective as it is.

The Community Advisory Board (CAB) is available for the Core Group and volunteers. Consisting of members of the LGBT community, the CAB provide relevant advice for the Core Group and volunteers of GBT young adults.

The Mpowerment Project Manual
The Mpowerment Project manual was released in 2002 and updated in 2010. The project manual is a free download on the Mpowerment Project website. The individually bound modules cover the following program components:
 Module 1: Overview
 Module 2: Community Assessment – Knowing your community
 Module 3: Implementing Agency
 Module 4: Coordinators
 Module 5: Core Group & Volunteers
 Module 6: Project Space
 Module 7: Formal Outreach – Social outreach events and outreach team
 Module 8: Informal Outreach
 Module 9: M-Groups
 Module 10: Publicizing the Mpowerment Project
 Module 11: The Community Advisory Board
 Module 12: Monitoring and Evaluation
 Module 13: M-Group Facilitator’s Guide
 Module 14: M-Group Meeting Guide
 Adaptation of the Mpowerment Project to African American / Black gay and bisexual men/MSM
 Adaptation of the Mpowerment Project to Latino gay and bisexual men/MSM
 Spanish translation of the Mpowerment manual

Mpowerment Projects in the United States

Alabama
 Birmingham - MPowerment

Alaska
 Anchorage – AMP Anchorage Men's Project

California
 Orange County - Somos OC
 San Diego – MPowerSD
 San Diego – In The Mix
 San Francisco - BRIDGEMEN

Florida
 Ft. Lauderdale – M Project
 Wilton Manors - SOMOS - Latinos Salud
 Orlando - The Gathering Center

Georgia
 Atlanta – Evolution Project

Idaho
 Pocatello – Genesis Project
 Boise - mpowermentBOI hosted by Allies Linked for the Prevention of HIV and AIDS

Illinois
 Champaign-Urbana – Mpowerment CU
 Charleston-Mattoon - Mpowerment Charleston-Mattoon

Indiana
 Bloomington – IlluMENate

Iowa
 Iowa City – Mpowerment Iowa City

Louisiana
 Lafayette – FM Project
 New Orleans – reVision, ME + U

Michigan
 Detroit – MPowerment Detroit
 Detroit - R.E.C. Boyz

Minnesota
 Minneapolis – PrideAlive

Missouri
 St. Louis - Mpower STL
 Springfield - Haven MPowerment

New Jersey
 Asbury Park - Project R.E.A.L
 Trenton – E=MC2: Empowering Men 2 Create Change
 Camden  - Project K.I.S. Keeping It Safe

New Mexico
 Albuquerque – MPower
 Albuquerque - MPower New Mexico Alumni

New York
 Long Island - MPowerment LI
 Manhattan - MPO
 Queens - Holatinos
 Bronx BxMpowerment

North Carolina
 Raleigh – M Club

Ohio
 Cleveland - Beyond Identities Community Center
 Columbus - Greater Columbus Mpowerment Center - 
 Dayton – Mu Crew
 Toledo - Toledo Mpowerment

Oregon
 Portland - Pivot

Pennsylvania
 Harrisburg/Lancaster, Pa - Mpower Pa

South Carolina
 Charleston - CHAMP CHarleston Area Mpowerment Project

Texas
 El Paso – The M Factor
 Austin – The Q Austin
 Dallas - United Black Ellument
 Dallas - Fuse

Utah
 Salt Lake City – The Village

Vermont
 Brattleboro – The Men's Program
 Burlington –  GLAM www.GLAMvt.org

Washington
 Olympia - Mpowerment Olympia
 Seattle – The MPowerment Project
 Spokane - Inland Northwest Men's Experience (INMx)

West Virginia
 Morgantown – Morgantown Mpowerment Project

See also

 Advocates for Youth
 List of LGBT community centers

References

External links
 Official The Mpowerment Project website
 The Center for AIDS Prevention Studies at the University of California San Francisco
 Effective Interventions.org:  Centers for Disease Control Effective Interventions Site
 Rand Corporation.org: "Cost-Effective Allocation of Government Funds for Preventing HIV"

HIV/AIDS in the United States
LGBT health organizations in the United States
M
Medical and health organizations based in California